Annie Jacobsen (born June 28, 1967) is an American investigative journalist, author, and a 2016 Pulitzer Prize finalist. She writes and produces television including Tom Clancy's Jack Ryan for Amazon Studios, and Clarice for CBS. She was a contributing editor to the Los Angeles Times Magazine from 2009 until 2012. Jacobsen writes about war, weapons, security, and secrets. Jacobsen is best known as the author of the 2011 non-fiction book, Area 51: An Uncensored History of America's Top Secret Military Base, which The New York Times called "cauldron-stirring." She is an internationally acclaimed and sometimes controversial author who, according to one critic, writes sensational books by addressing popular conspiracies.

Books
Her 2011 book, Area 51: An Uncensored History of America's Top Secret Military Base, addresses the Roswell UFO incident. It was on The New York Times Best Seller list for thirteen weeks and has been translated into six languages. Area 51 was being developed into an AMC Series with Gale Anne Hurd as executive producer but is no longer.

Jacobsen's 2014 book, Operation Paperclip: The Secret Intelligence Program That Brought Nazi Scientists to America was called "perhaps the most comprehensive, up-to-date narrative available to the general public" in a review by Jay Watkins of the CIA's Center for the Study of Intelligence. Operation Paperclip was included in a list of the best books of 2014 by The Boston Globe. Leading space historian Michael J. Neufeld, gave a negative review of the book: “Jacobsen concentrates on the scandals, which inevitably leads to an imbalance in presentation. Little is said about the substantive contributions of von Braun.”

The Pentagon's Brain: An Uncensored History of DARPA, America's Top Secret Military Research Agency, was chosen as finalist for the 2016 Pulitzer Prize in history. The Pulitzer committee described the book as "A brilliantly researched account of a small but powerful secret government agency whose military research profoundly affects world affairs." The Washington Post, The Boston Globe and the Amazon Editors chose Pentagon's Brain as one of the best non-fiction books of 2015.

Her next book was published in March 2017:
Phenomena: The Secret History of the U.S. Government's Investigations into Extrasensory Perception and Psychokinesis.

In May 2019, she released Surprise, Kill, Vanish: The Secret History of CIA Paramilitary Armies, Operators, and Assassins. Apple audiobooks recorded SKV as one of the most popular audiobooks of 2019. J. R. Seeger, a retired CIA case officer who led the Agency's Team Alpha, the first Americans behind enemy lines after 9/11, reviewed the book, saying: "Jacobsen has a well-deserved reputation as a good writer and an excellent researcher,” but he criticized her attention to detail, and suggested that the book's focus was too general saying that "neither of the topics are discussed in anything resembling the detail required to understand the nuance of covert action".

Television 
Jacobsen co-wrote three episodes of Tom Clancy's Jack Ryan TV series for Amazon Studios. She was a consulting and writing producer on all of Seasons one and two.

In 2017, Amblin Entertainment and Blumhouse TV bought the rights to her book Phenomena for a scripted TV series, with Jacobsen and X-Files writer/producer Glen Morgan co-writing the pilot script.

On Flight 327

In 2004, Jacobsen wrote an article about an incident she witnessed with a group of thirteen foreign nationals on board a flight from Detroit to Los Angeles. Two air marshals came out of cover during flight. FBI and homeland security agents met the aircraft when it landed. In May 2007, the Department of Homeland Security declassified a report about the flight. The men were identified as twelve Syrians, members of a musical group, and a Lebanese, their promoter; all were traveling illegally on expired visas. Eight of the men had "positive hits" for past criminal records and suspicious behavior. They were involved in an earlier incident on an aircraft which had them on the FBI watch list. However, the report noted that the musicians were not terrorists and law enforcement assessments at the time were appropriate.

Works
 Terror in the Skies: Why 9/11 Could Happen Again. Spence Publishing Company, 2005, .
 Area 51: An Uncensored History of America's Top Secret Military Base, Hachette Digital, Inc., 2011, .
 
 
 
Surprise, Kill, Vanish: The Secret History of CIA Paramilitary Armies, Operators, and Assassins. Little, Brown and Company. 2019.

References

External links

 NPR interview
 NPR's Fresh Air, "Was it UFOs or the USSR?" May 17, 2011
 Jacobsen on ABC Nightline
 Tavis Smiley interview
 The Daily Show, Jon Stewart, May 17, 2011
 
Joe Rogan Experience #1299 - Annie Jacobsen

American investigative journalists
American women journalists
Living people
21st-century American journalists
21st-century American women writers
Princeton University alumni
Los Angeles Times people
People from Middletown, Connecticut
1967 births